Pantaleoni is a surname of Italian extraction and may refer:

 Téa Leoni (born Elizabeth Téa Pantaleoni), American actress
 Helenka Pantaleoni, American silent film actress and humanitarian
 Hewitt Pantaleoni, American ethnomusicologist
 Maffeo Pantaleoni, Italian economist and politician
 Romilda Pantaleoni, Italian soprano

See also
 Pantaleon (disambiguation)